Oncosperma is a genus of flowering plant in the family Arecaceae. It contains the following species, native to Southeast Asia and Sri Lanka:

 Oncosperma fasciculatum Thwaites - Sri Lanka
 Oncosperma gracilipes Becc. - Philippines
 Oncosperma horridum (Griff.) Scheff - Philippines, Thailand, Malaysia, Borneo, Sulawesi, Sumatra 
 Oncosperma platyphyllum Becc. - Philippines
 Oncosperma tigillarium  (Jack) Ridl. - Thailand, Cambodia, Vietnam, Malaysia, Borneo, Sumatra

References

 
Arecaceae genera
Taxonomy articles created by Polbot